Mark Engel may refer to:

Mark Engel (bishop), born 1955, American bishop of the Anglican Church in North America
Mark Engel (skier), born 1991, American alpine ski racer